Charlie Baum (born December 13, 1972) is an American politician and a Republican member of the Tennessee House of Representatives, representing District 37 since November 6, 2018.

Background

Education 
Charlie attended Wake Forest University in Winston-Salem, North Carolina where he earned his B.A. in economics in 1995. Baum then attended The University of North Carolina Chapel Hill, where he received his Ph.D. in economics in 1999.

Teaching career 
Charlie currently teaches economics at Middle Tennessee State University in Murfreesboro, TN. He has taught at MTSU since August 1999.

Personal life 
Charlie was raised in Knoxville, TN. He is married to his wife Kelly and they have 3 children: Elizabeth (15), Anna Jane (13), and Charles (12). His children attend the Siegel schools in Murfreesboro. His family are active members of the First United Methodist Church in Murfreesboro.

2018 Election

2018 District 37 Republican Primary Election Results 
The District 37 Republican Primary Election took place on August 2, 2018.

2018 District 37 General Election Results 
The District 37 General Election took place on November 6, 2018.

Current Legislative Committees

Community involvement

Volunteer work 
Charlie was a board member for 4 years at the United Way of Rutherford and Cannon Counties from 2013–2017. He was a board member at the American Heart Association of Rutherford County for 5 years from 2012–2017. He was a county commissioner at the Rutherford County Commission for 8 years from 2010–2018. He was a board member on the Murfreesboro City School Foundation for 6 years from 2013–2019. He is currently a board member on the Linebaugh Library Foundation Board, where he has served since 2015. He is currently a board member at Oaklands Historic Mansion, where he has served since 2016.

Organizations 
Charlie has been a part of the American Academy of Economics and Financial Experts (AAEFE) since 2015. He has been a part of National Association of Forensic Economists since January 2013.

Published work 
Charlie published Calculating Economic Losses from Wrongful Incarceration in the Tennessee Bar Journal in July 2016. Charlie published Employee Tenure and Economic Losses in Wrongful Termination Cases in the Journal of Forensic Economics in 2013.

Honors and awards 
In 1988, Charlie became an Eagle Scout, as a part of the Boy Scouts of America. From 2008–2014, Charlie served as a chair in the Department of Economics and Finance at MTSU.

References 

1972 births
Living people
Republican Party members of the Tennessee House of Representatives
Wake Forest University alumni
University of North Carolina at Chapel Hill alumni
Middle Tennessee State University faculty
21st-century American politicians